Narengi (Pron: nʌˈreŋgɪ or næˈreŋgɪ) is a locality in Guwahati. Located in the extreme east of city, it is sparsely populated. An army camp is located in southern part of the locality. The Narangi railway station on the southern part which is near to the Assam State Electricity Board colony. All the trains connecting the districts of Eastern Assam passes through this station. It comes under Noonmati Police Station. The Pin code of Narengi is 781026.

Education
There are several primary and high schools in this area. However, there are a few colleges which offer a bachelor's degree, Narangi Anchalik Mahavidyalaya. Some local schools are Kendriya Vidyalaya (Narengi), Army Public School, Narangi, Sankardev Shishu/Vidya Niketan, East Point Montessori School, Narengi High School, ASEB High School, Maria's Public School, Bishnu Jyoti School, Narengi High School, Vidya Mandir English Medium High School, St. Francis De Sales School and MerryLand Public School.

Recreation
In LG Tower area the Gold Digital Cinema multiplex is located which shows 2D movies. Thakuriya novelty is the place for gaming, with various gaming options.

Industries
The Pipeline Headquarter of Oil India situated in Narengi. The PDP Steel branch of the Assam Roofing Ltd is also situated in Narengi. Moreover, there are other companies like Kamakhya Plastics Private Limited, Assam enterprise Limited etc.

See also
 Chandmari
 Maligaon
 Uzan Bazaar
 Beltola
 Noonmati
 Panbazar

References

Neighbourhoods in Guwahati